La Salle-Prunet is a former commune in the Lozère department in southern France. On 1 January 2016, it was merged into the new commune of Florac-Trois-Rivières. Its population was 178 in 2019.

See also
Communes of the Lozère department

References

Salleprunet